Federal law is the body of law created by the federal government of a country.

Federal law may also refer to:
 Federal Law (United States), a body of law which originates with the Constitution
 Federal Law (Russia)

See also 
 Federal common law, a term of United States law
 Federal Constitutional Law (disambiguation)
 Federation#Federal governments